Otto Maier may refer to:
 Otto Maier (rowing)
 Otto Maier (footballer)